Necroteuthis is an extinct genus of vampire squids from the Oligocene of Hungary. It contains one species, N. hungarica. It was initially identified as a squid, but was recently reinterpreted as a vampyroteuthid.

References

Octopodiformes
Prehistoric cephalopod genera